"So Much in Love" is a song written by George Williams and Bill Jackson, and arranged by Roy Straigis. It was originally performed by American soul vocal group the Tymes and was their first hit single, topping the US Billboard Hot 100 singles chart on August 3, 1963, and remaining there for one week, as well as peaking at No. 4 on the Hot R&B Singles chart.

All-4-One version

American R&B vocal group All-4-One released "So Much in Love" in late 1993 as their debut single. It peaked at No. 5 on the US Billboard Hot 100 in early 1994 and was certified gold by the Recording Industry Association of America (RIAA), selling 600,000 copies. It also reached No. 3 in New Zealand, No. 29 in Belgium and No. 49 in the UK. All-4-One's version is based on a version by a group called AFD whose version was released not long before All-4-One's. A rare music video was also made.

Background and composition
The group had not heard the original song by the Tymes before. One of the producers of the cover record, Gary St. Clair, had reached out over a call with a concept asking for the group to be a part of the new recording. "So Much in Love" was also the first work All-4-One had done together; the doo-wop sound had not been an intention stylistically for the group.

Critical reception
Dave Sholin from the Gavin Report commented, "Recalling those street corner harmonies of old, this sensational cover of the Tymes' 1963 summer smash caught fire at the tail end of 1993. It's one of those songs that gets on the air and within seconds, captures the audience. Strong request activity." Dennis Hunt from Los Angeles Times declared it as a "glorious remake", naming it "a highlight of this excellent album".

Charts

Weekly charts

Year-end charts

Certifications

Release history

Other versions
The song has been covered several times: 
In 1978, the group Cheek released a version which peaked at No. 31 in Australia.
In 1982, Eagles member Timothy B. Schmit contributed his version of the song on the soundtrack to Fast Times at Ridgemont High.  The single reached No. 59 on the Hot 100.
English band the Housemartins covered the song in 1986 as the B-side to their No.1 hit single, "Caravan of Love".
A 1988 rendition by Art Garfunkel got to No. 11 on the Adult Contemporary chart.
In 1989, a salsa versión by Henry Fiol was recorded for the album Renacimiento (El Abuelo Records).
In the 1994 album Live: Out on the Road by the Flirtations.

References

1963 songs
1963 debut singles
1982 singles
1988 singles
1993 debut singles
1994 singles
The Tymes songs
Timothy B. Schmit songs
Jay and the Americans songs
Art Garfunkel songs
All-4-One songs
Atlantic Records singles
Billboard Hot 100 number-one singles
Contemporary R&B ballads
Rhythm and blues ballads
A cappella songs